CGTN Africa is the African division of China Global Television Network (CGTN), the English-language news channel run by Chinese state broadcaster China Central Television (CCTV). It is based in Nairobi and manages bureaux in Lagos, Cairo and Johannesburg, as well as other centres in Africa. The channel was previously known as CCTV Africa.

CGTN Africa employs Kenyan, African and other international journalists and produces African based programs. There are about 100 employees at CGTN Africa most of them Kenyans.

It is the intention of CGTN Africa to promote a better understanding of Africa in China as well as to promote a cultural connection between the people of both places. The idea is that African news is better depicted from an African perspective. CGTN focuses on politics, economy, trade and culture.

Programming
Africa Live – One hour of African news and analysis, is aimed at reporting social, political and economic  issues in Africa. Africa Live is mainly anchored by Beatrice Marshall from CGTN Africa's studios in Nairobi. It is also anchored by Lindy Mtongana, Peninah Karibe and Ramah Nyang.
Global Business – Covers Africa's ever changing business landscape. Global Business is anchored by Ramah Nyang from CGTN Africa's studios in Nairobi.
Match Point – covers African sports news. Match Point is anchored by Mahia Mutua from CGTN Africa's studios in Nairobi.
Talk Africa – a 30-minute weekly talk show that mainly discusses politics and current affairs in Africa. Talk Africa is anchored by Beatrice Marshall from CGTN Africa's studios in Nairobi.
Faces of Africa – extraordinary stories about people in Africa. Faces of Africa is anchored by Ramah Nyang from CGTN Africa's studios in Nairobi.

History
Chinese Premier Li Keqiang visited the then CCTV Africa offices in 2014.

References

External links 
 

China Global Television Network channels
Chinese diaspora in Africa
English-language television stations
Television stations in Kenya
Mass media in Nairobi
Television channels and stations established in 2012
2012 establishments in China